CKTZ-FM is a  radio station which operates a community radio format on the frequency 89.5 MHz (FM) in Cortes Island, British Columbia, Canada.

History

On October 18, 2011, Cortes Community Radio Society received approval from the Canadian Radio-television and Telecommunications Commission (CRTC) to operate a new FM community radio station at Cortes Island.

See also
List of community radio stations in Canada

References

External links
Cortes Island Community Radio
 Cortes Community Radio Society (unofficial) at ncra.ca
 

KTZ
KTZ
Radio stations established in 2011